Schizopyge dainellii is a species of cyprinid freshwater fish found in the Indus basin in Pakistan.

References 

Schizopyge
Fish described in 1916